William Hammond (6 January 1719 – 19 August 1783) was an English hymnist.  He was born in Battle, Sussex, England. He was educated at Saint John's College, Cambridge. In 1743 he joined the Calvinistic Methodists, and in 1745 joined the Moravian Brethren.

His works include an autobiography in Greek, which has not been published. His original hymns, together with his translations of older Latin hymns, were published in his Psalms, Hymns and Spiritual Songs.  Several of his hymns are included in the Sacred Harp.  William Hammond is buried in the Moravian cemetery in Chelsea, London.

External links
Hymns by William Hammond

1719 births
1783 deaths
Calvinist and Reformed hymnwriters
English hymnwriters
English Methodists
Calvinistic Methodists
Evangelists
Writers of the Moravian Church
People from Battle, East Sussex
English people of the Moravian Church